During World War II, the United States Army divided its operations around the world into four theaters. Forces from many different Allied nations fought in these theaters. Other Allied countries have different conceptions of the theaters and/or different names for them.

European Theater of Operations campaigns

US Army 
The 16 officially recognized US Army campaigns in the European Theater of Operations are:

 North Africa campaigns:
 Egypt-Libya: 11 June 1942 – 12 February 1943, American participation in the Western Desert campaign
 Algeria-French Morocco: 8–11 November 1942, the allied landings in North Africa
 Tunisia: 17 November 1942 – 13 May 1943, the Tunisian campaign
 Italy campaigns:
 Sicily: 9 July – 17 August 1943, the allied invasion and liberation of Sicily
 Naples-Foggia:
 Air: 18 August 1943 – 21 January 1944
 Ground: 9 September 1943 – 21 January 1944, from the Allied invasion of Italy to the Winter Line battles
 Anzio: 22 January – 24 May 1944, the landing and battle at Anzio
 Rome–Arno: 22 January – 9 September 1944, from the landing at Anzio to the arrival at the Gothic Line
 Northern Apennines: 10 September 1944 – 4 April 1945, the Gothic Line battles
 Po Valley: 5 April – 8 May 1945, the allied spring offensive 1945

 Western Europe campaigns:
 Air Offensive Europe: 4 July 1942 – 5 June 1944, from the first American bombing mission over enemy-occupied territory in Europe to the night before D-day
 Normandy: 6 June – 24 July 1944, the allied landings in Normandy
 Northern France: 25 July – 14 September 1944, from Operation Cobra to the beginning of Operation Market Garden
 Southern France: 15 August – 14 September 1944, the allied landings in Southern France
 Rhineland: 15 September 1944 – 21 March 1945, from Operation Market Garden to the start of the allied invasion of Germany
 Ardennes-Alsace: 16 December 1944 – 25 January 1945, the Battle of the Bulge
 Central Europe: 22 March – 11 May 1945, the allied invasion of Germany

US Navy 
The nine officially recognized US Navy campaigns in the European Theater of Operations are:

 North African occupation: allied landings in North Africa
 Sicilian occupation: allied landings in Sicily
 Salerno landings: allied landings in Southern Italy
 West Coast of Italy operations (1944): allied landing at Anzio and subsequent supply of the Anzio beachhead
 Invasion of Normandy: allied landings in Normandy
 Northeast Greenland operation
 Invasion of Southern France: allied landings in Southern France
 Reinforcement of Malta: allied convoys to supply besieged Malta
 Escort, antisubmarine, armed guard and special operations

Pacific Theater of Operations

Operational commands were the Pacific Ocean and South West Pacific.

US Army 
The 16 officially recognized US Army campaigns in the Pacific Theater of Operations are:

 Pacific Ocean Areas Command:
 Central Pacific: 7 December 1941 – 6 December 1943, allied landings on Tarawa and Makin during the Gilbert and Marshall Islands campaign
 Air Offensive Japan: 17 April 1942 – 2 September 1945
 Aleutian Islands: 3 June 1942 – 24 August 1943, the Aleutian Islands campaign
 Northern Solomons: 22 February 1943 – 21 November 1944, part of the Solomon Islands campaign
 Eastern Mandates: 31 January – 14 June 1944, allied landings on Kwajalein and Eniwetok during the Gilbert and Marshall Islands campaign
 Western Pacific: 15 June 1944 – 2 September 1945, the Mariana and Palau Islands campaign
 Ryukyus: 26 March – 2 July 1945, the allied landings on Okinawa

 South West Pacific Areas Command:
 Philippine Islands: 7 December 1941 – 10 May 1942, the Japanese conquest Philippines
 East Indies: 1 January – 22 July 1942, Japanese conquest of the Dutch East Indies
 Papua: 23 July 1942 – 23 January 1943, part of the New Guinea campaign
 Guadalcanal: 7 August 1942 – 21 February 1943, the Guadalcanal campaign
 New Guinea: 24 January 1943 – 31 December 1944, the New Guinea campaign
 Bismarck Archipelago: 15 December 1943 – 27 November 1944
 Leyte: 17 October 1944 – 1 July 1945, allied landings and liberation of Leyte
 Luzon: 15 December 1944 – 4 July 1945, allied landings and liberation of Luzon
 Southern Philippines: 27 February – 4 July 1945, allied liberation of the Southern Philippines during the Philippines campaign

US Navy campaigns
The 43 officially recognized US Navy campaigns in the Pacific Theater of Operations are:

 Pearl Harbor: Pearl Harbor-Midway: 7 December 1941
 Wake Island: 8–23 December 1941
 Philippine Islands operation: 8 December 1941 – 6 May 1942
 Netherlands East Indies engagements: 23 January – 27 February 1942
 Pacific raids (1942): 1 February – 10 March 1942
 Coral Sea: 4–8 May 1942
 Midway: 3–6 June 1942
 Guadalcanal-Tulagi landings: 7–9 August 1942 (First Savo)
 Capture and defense of Guadalcanal: 10 August 1942 – 8 February 1943
 Makin Raid: 17–18 August 1942
 Eastern Solomons 23–25 August 1942
 Buin-Faisi-Tonolai raid: 5 October 1942
 Cape Esperance: 11–12 October 1942 (Second Savo)
 Santa Cruz Islands: 26 October 1942
 Guadalcanal: 12–15 November 1942 (Third Savo)
 Tassafaronga: 30 November – 1 December 1942 (Fourth Savo)
 Eastern New Guinea operation: 17 December 1942 – 24 July 1944
 Rennel Island: 29-30 January 1943
 Consolidation of Solomon Islands: 8 February 1943 – 15 March 1945
 Aleutians operation: 26 March – 2 June 1943
 New Georgia Group operation: 20 June – 16 October 1943
 Bismarck Archipelago operation: 25 June 1943 – 1 May 1944
 Pacific raids (1943): 31 August – 6 October 1943
 Treasury-Bougainville operation: 27 October – 15 December 1943
 Gilbert Islands operation: 13 November – 8 December 1943
 Marshall Islands operation: 26 November 1943 – 2 March 1944
 Asiatic-Pacific raids (1944): 16 February – 9 October 1944
 Western New Guinea operations: 21 April 1944 – 9 January 1945
 Marianas operation: 10 June – 27 August 1944
 Western Caroline Islands operation: 31 August – 14 October 1944
 Leyte operation: 10 October – 29 November 1944
 Luzon operation: 12 December 1944 – 1 April 1945
 Iwo Jima operation 15 February – 16 March 1945
 Okinawa Gunto operation: 17 March – 30 June 1945
 Third Fleet operations against Japan: 10 July – 15 August 1945
 Kurile Islands operation: 1 February 1944 – 11 August 1945
 Borneo operations: 27 April – 20 July 1945
 Tinian capture and occupation: 24 July – 1 August 1944
 Consolidation of the Southern Philippines: 28 February – 20 July 1945
 Hollandia operation: 21 April – 1 June 1944
 Manila Bay-Bicol operations: 29 January – 16 April 1945
 Escort, antisubmarine, armed guard and special operations: 7 December 1941 – 2 September 1945
 Submarine War Patrols (Pacific): 7 December 1941 – 2 September 1945

China Burma India Theater 
The China Burma India Theater served more as an Administrative Command rather than a Theater of Operations and lacked any true Operational Command. The Operational Command was joint Allied South East Asia Command in the South-East Asian Theater. The American General Joseph Stilwell commanded the operational Northern Combat Area Command and used his other positions to communicate directly with Joint Chiefs of Staff about operational matters.

The officially recognized US Army campaigns in the China Burma India Theater are:

 Burma campaigns:
 Burma 1942: 7 December 1941 – 26 May 1942, allied defensive operations during the Japanese conquest of Burma
 India-Burma: 2 April 1942 – 28 January 1945, allied operations in Burma 1942–43 and Burma and India 1944
 Central Burma: 29 January – 15 July 1945, the allied Burma offensive in 1945

 China campaigns:
 China Defensive: 4 July 1942 – 4 May 1945
 China Offensive: 5 May – 2 September 1945

References

Theaters and campaigns of World War II
Military units and formations of the United States Army in World War II